KANM may refer to:

 KANM (FM), a radio station (90.3 FM) licensed to serve Grants, New Mexico, United States
 KIVA (AM), a radio station (1600 AM) licensed to serve Albuquerque, New Mexico, United States, which held the call sign KANM from 2002 to 2005
 KESP, a radio station (970 AM) licensed to serve Modesto, California, United States, which held the call sign KANM from 1998 to 2000